Zhaneta Andrea (22 March 1937 – 14 October 2022) was an Albanian archeologist and prehistorian. She has been described as an "emblem of Albanian archaeology".

Life and career
Born in Korçë, Andrea graduated in Archeology at the Sofia University and took part in her first excavations in 1962. One of the first women archeologists in Albania, her researches mainly focused on her country's prehistory, from Neolithic to Bronze Age and Iron Age settlements. She authored numerous scientific articles and a monograph, Kultura ilire e tumave në Pellgun e Korçës ("Illyrian culture of mounds in the Korça region").  Andrea died in  Tirana on 14 October 2022, at the age of 85 years old.

Further reading
 Lafe, Emil, ed. (2009). Fjalor Enciklopedik Shqiptar [Encyclopedic Dictionary of Albania]. Vol. 2. Academy of Sciences of Albania. p. 72.

References

External links  
 

1937 births
2022 deaths
People from Korçë
Albanian archaeologists
Prehistorians
Sofia University alumni